Hutto High School is a public high school located in Hutto, Texas, USA, and classified as a 6A school by the UIL.  It is part of the Hutto Independent School District located in east central Williamson County (part of the greater Austin-Round Rock area). In 2015, the school was rated "met standard" by the Texas Education Agency.

History
In 2019, Hutto ISD voters approved a $194 million bond for school district improvements, which included $60.8 million for Hutto High School. Of that $60.8 million, $15.86 million were allocated for stadium renovations. Before the renovations, the stadium had a capacity of 4,700 with two concession stands and two restroom facilities. After the renovations, the stadium ha a capacity of 10,000, with four concession stands and four restroom facilities.

Athletics
The Hutto Hippos participate in cross country, volleyball, football, wrestling, basketball, powerlifting, swimming, soccer, golf, tennis, track, bowling, softball, and baseball.

State titles
Volleyball -  - 1999(2A)
Tennis - 2016(5A)

State finalists
Boys basketball -  - 1961(1A), 1964(1A)
Football –  - 2005(3A/D2)
Volleyball -  - 1998(2A)

Activities
Extracurricular activities available at Hutto High School include step, band, color guard, theater, JROTC, football, basketball, soccer, baseball, yearbook, journalism, and cross country.

Notable alumni

References

External links
 Hutto Independent School District

High schools in Williamson County, Texas
Public high schools in Texas